Oceanographic Institute may refer to:

Oceanographic Institute, Foundation Albert I, Prince of Monaco
Oceanographic Institute of Paris
Oceanographic Institute of Venezuela
Harbor Branch Oceanographic Institute
Nha Trang Oceanography Institute
N.Z. Oceanographic Institute

See also
Institute of Oceanography (disambiguation)
National Institute of Oceanography (disambiguation)